Svoronata is a village in the municipal unit Leivatho, southern Cephalonia, Greece. It is situated on a hillside near the Ionian Sea coast. It is 2 km west of Metaxata, 2 km east of the Cephalonia International Airport and 7 km southeast of Argostoli.

See also
List of settlements in Cephalonia

Populated places in Cephalonia